The Buffalo Correctional Facility was a minimum security prison for males in New York, United States.  The prison was located in town of Alden, east of the Buffalo, adjacent to the Wende Correctional Facility. As of 2012, the facility has been closed by the New York State Department of Corrections and Community Supervision.

References

External links 
  NY prison information

Buildings and structures in Erie County, New York
Defunct prisons in New York (state)